Neale Andrew Fraser  (born 3 October 1933) is a former number one amateur male tennis-player from Australia, born in Melbourne, Victoria, the son of a Victorian judge. Fraser is the last man to have completed the triple crown, i.e. having won the singles, doubles and mixed doubles titles at a Grand Slam tournament, which he managed on two consecutive occasions, in 1959 and 1960 (both times at US National, now known as US Open); no male player has equalled this feat at any Grand Slam tournament since.

After his playing days were over, he was non-playing captain of Australia's Davis Cup team for a record 24 years.

Biography
He was the son of barrister and politician Archibald Fraser.

Fraser was taught by coach Bryan Slattery, and later won the Wimbledon singles in 1960 and the US Championships singles in 1959 and 1960. Fraser failed to win the Australian Championships, finishing as runner-up on three occasions (1957, 1959 and 1960) and held a championship point in the 1960 final. Team play – doubles and Davis Cup – proved nearest to Fraser's heart. In doubles, Fraser took three Australian (1957, 1958, and 1962), French (1958, 1960, and 1962) and US (1957, 1959, and 1960) titles, and two Wimbledon (1959, and 1961) with three different partners, Ashley Cooper, Lew Hoad, and Roy Emerson.

Fraser was also successful in the mixed doubles, winning the Australian in 1956 with Beryl Penrose, Wimbledon in 1962, and the US from 1958 to 1960 with Margaret Osborne duPont. He holds the distinction of having won the US National (now Open) singles, doubles and mixed doubles titles in 1959 and then successfully defending those titles a year later. Since that time, no one has equalled that feat at a grand slam tournament, let alone successively.

Fraser was ranked the World No. 1 amateur in 1959 and 1960 by Lance Tingay of The Daily Telegraph, and was in the top 10 every year between 1956 and 1962.

Fraser became Davis Cup Captain for the Australian team in 1970, holding the position for a record 24 years and piloting Australia to four wins in 1973, 1977, 1983 and 1986, and recording 55 wins from 75 ties played.

Fraser is one of the 20 men to win all four majors in doubles, and in 1984, he was elected into the International Tennis Hall of Fame.

Fraser was honoured with an MBE in 1974 and an AO in 1988. He was chairman of the Sport Australia Hall of Fame from 1997 until 2005. In 2008, he received the International Tennis Federation's highest honour: the Phillippe Chartier Award for outstanding achievements in tennis.

Fraser was also the centenary ambassador for Davis Cup, and was the first recipient of the ITF and International Hall of Fame's Davis Cup Award of Excellence.

Neale Fraser is married with children and grandchildren. He was voted Victorian Father of the Year in 1974.

Grand Slam finals

Singles: 7 (3 wins, 4 losses)

Doubles: 18 (11 wins, 7 losses)

Mixed doubles: 7 (5 titles, 2 runner-ups)

Grand Slam performance timeline

Singles

References

External links 
 
 
 
 
 
 
 Historic images and video of Neale Fraser talking about his career on Culture Victoria

1933 births
Living people
Australian Championships (tennis) champions
Australian male tennis players
French Championships (tennis) champions
Australian Members of the Order of the British Empire
Officers of the Order of Australia
Tennis players from Melbourne
International Tennis Hall of Fame inductees
United States National champions (tennis)
Wimbledon champions (pre-Open Era)
People educated at St Kevin's College, Melbourne
Grand Slam (tennis) champions in men's singles
Grand Slam (tennis) champions in mixed doubles
Grand Slam (tennis) champions in men's doubles
World number 1 ranked male tennis players
Sport Australia Hall of Fame inductees
20th-century Australian people